Besednice is a market town in Český Krumlov District in the South Bohemian Region of the Czech Republic. It has about 800 inhabitants.

Administrative parts
The village of Malče is an administrative part of Besednice.

Geography
It lies in the Gratzen Foothills.

The landscape around the Besednice is known as a site of the moldavites. It is protected as a nature monument Besednické vltavíny.

Sights

References

Populated places in Český Krumlov District
Market towns in the Czech Republic